The Chairman of the United Development Party is the highest position in the United Development Party. The position was formed after the establishment of PPP on 5 January 1973.

According to the constitution of the party, the chairman is part of the daily board and elected through the muktamar of the party. The chairman is elected for a renewable five-year term.

The chairman is not allowed to hold a duplicate department of the Leadership Council on any level of the party.

List

References

Bibliography 

C